The Kid Sister is a 1945 American film directed by Sam Newfield.

The film is also known as All in the Family (American alternative title).

Plot summary 
Joan Hollingsworth's mother orders her to remain in her bedroom during a party for older sister Ethel, whose beau J. Waldo Barnes is the guest of honor. Tired of her sister always being favored, Joan sneaks out of the house and runs into a burglar who is thinking about robbing it.

A police officer comes along so Joan, not wanting to get arrested but also not wanting her mother to discover what she's up to, convinces the cop that she's employed for the party as a maid. She goes back inside and tries not to be found out, successful right up to the very end.

Cast 
Roger Pryor as J. Waldo Barnes
Judy Clark as Joan Hollingsworth
Frank Jenks as Burglar
Constance Worth as Ethel Hollingsworth
Tom Dugan as Michael the Cop
Richard Byron as Tommy
Minerva Urecal as Mrs. Wiggins
Ruth Robinson as Mrs. Hollingsworth
Peggy Wynne as Martha

External links 

1945 films
1940s English-language films
American black-and-white films
American comedy-drama films
American drama short films
Producers Releasing Corporation films
1945 comedy-drama films
1945 short films
Films directed by Sam Newfield
1940s American films